Coyote Ugly is a 2000 American musical comedy-drama film based on the Coyote Ugly Saloon. It was directed by David McNally, produced by Jerry Bruckheimer and Chad Oman, and written by Gina Wendkos. Set in New York City, the film stars Piper Perabo in her breakthrough role, Adam Garcia, Maria Bello, Melanie Lynskey, John Goodman, Izabella Miko, Bridget Moynahan, and Tyra Banks.

Although the film was critically panned, it was a box office success, grossing over $113 million worldwide. The film has become a cult classic over the years. Banks claimed that she had been lobbying for a sequel for years, reaching out to much of the original cast and crew for consideration.

Plot 
Violet Sanford leaves her hometown of South Amboy, New Jersey, her father Bill, and her best friend Gloria, to pursue her dreams of becoming a songwriter in nearby New York City. Violet tries multiple times to get her demo tape noticed by the recording studios but is unsuccessful. One night, she tries to get herself noticed by a music industry scout. The bartender jokingly points out Kevin O'Donnell, making her believe that he is the bar manager. When she discovers the joke, Violet feels hurt because she thinks Kevin was trying to make her look foolish. With only a few dollars left in her pocket after her apartment is burglarized, she goes to an all-night diner and notices three girls, Cammie, Rachel, and Zoe, flaunting the hundreds of dollars in tips they earned. After inquiring, she finds out that they work at a trendy bar named Coyote Ugly.

She finds her way to the bar and convinces the bar owner Lil to give her an audition. Violet's first audition does not go well, but after Violet breaks up a fight between two customers, Lil gives her a second audition. At her second audition, Violet douses the fire warden in water which costs Lil $250. However, Lil decides she can work at the bar if she can make up $250 in one night. Kevin turns up at the bar, and Violet auctions him off to another woman at the bar to earn the money. Kevin tells Violet that she owes him, so Violet agrees to go on four dates with him. The two begin a relationship.

Kevin commits himself to help Violet overcome her stage fright, which she is informed she will have to do to have her songs heard. Violet tells Kevin she inherited her stage fright from her now-deceased mother, who also moved to New York in her youth to pursue her dreams of singing. Violet's stage fright mostly extends to singing her original pieces, as she can sing in the bar doing karaoke to help Cammie and Rachel break up a fight between customers.

One night, her father Bill comes to see her at work after a photo of her on the bar appears in the paper. When he arrives, she is dancing on the bar counter with the other bartenders pouring pitchers of water over her. He is angry about her job and refuses to talk to her when she calls him shortly after. She keeps the job despite her father's wishes, but shortly thereafter gets fired when Kevin gets into a fight at the bar. She and Kevin then break up. With her dreams not working and her job at the bar lost, Violet goes to New Jersey for Gloria's wedding. That night, Bill gets hit by a car and is seriously injured, which almost prompts Violet to move back to New Jersey. However, Bill convinces her not to give up while telling her the truth: her mother did not have a problem with stage fright and quit singing because of Bill.

Back in New York Lil visits Violet at a restaurant where she is now working and the two make amends. Violet finishes a new song and later performs it at an open mic night at the Bowery Ballroom. After a difficult start, she gets help from Kevin and can sing. The Coyotes, Bill, and Gloria are also there for moral support. The performance leads to a deal with a record label. The film concludes back at Coyote Ugly with LeAnn Rimes, having recorded Violet's song, singing on the bar as Violet joins in and Violet kissing Kevin celebrating her dream coming true.

Cast 
 Piper Perabo as Violet Sanford
 Adam Garcia as Kevin O'Donnell
 John Goodman as William James “Bill” Sanford
 Maria Bello as Lil
 Izabella Miko as Cammie
 Tyra Banks as Zoe
 Bridget Moynahan as Rachel
 Melanie Lynskey as Gloria
 Del Pentecost as Lou
 Michael Weston as Danny
 LeAnn Rimes as Herself
 John Fugelsang as Richie, The Booker
 Bud Cort as Romero
 Melody Perkins as New Coyote (uncredited)
 Michael Bay as Photographer

Production

Writing 
Kevin Smith, who did an uncredited rewrite of the script, stated that a total of eight writers worked on the script, while the Writers Guild of America only gave credit to Gina Wendkos, who wrote the first draft of the script, which, according to Smith, scarcely resembles the final film. (See WGA screenwriting credit system.) Jeff Nathanson wrote a draft that director David McNally credits as the draft that "brought the thing home"; Nathanson was credited on the initial theatrical poster but not in the finished film. Carrie Fisher also wrote a draft.

Casting 
Early on, before the producers decided to cast mostly unknown actors, the lead role of Violet Sanford was offered to pop singer Jessica Simpson, who turned it down. January Jones also auditioned for a role.

Filming 
Principal photography took place in Manhattan and small towns in New Jersey including South Amboy and Sea Bright for a month. Production then moved to California and shooting took place in Los Angeles, West Hollywood, Pasadena, and San Pedro.

Title 
The film was based on an article, "The Muse of the Coyote Ugly Saloon", in GQ by Elizabeth Gilbert, who worked as a bartender in the East Village, Manhattan. The bar, which opened in 1993, quickly became a favorite of the Lower East Side hipsters.

As mentioned in the film, the slang term "coyote ugly" refers to the feeling of waking up after a one-night stand, and discovering that one's arm is underneath someone who is so physically repulsive that one would gladly chew it off without waking the person just so one can get away without being discovered. Coyotes are known to gnaw off limbs if they are stuck in a trap, to facilitate escape.

Reception

Box office 
Coyote Ugly opened fourth at the North American box office making US$17,319,282 in its opening weekend. It went on to gross $60,786,269 domestically and $53,130,205 around the world to a total of $113,916,474 worldwide, becoming a box office success.

Critical response 
The film received negative reviews from critics. Criticisms and praise centered around the belief that it was little more than an excuse to portray "hot, sexy women dancing on a bar in a wet T-shirt contest". On Rotten Tomatoes it has an approval rating of 23% based on 104 reviews, with an average rating of 3.8/10. The site's consensus states: "Coyote Ugly has an enthusiastically trashy energy and undeniable aesthetic appeal, but it's nowhere near enough to make up for the film's shallow, unimaginative story." On Metacritic it has a weighted average score of 27 out of 100, based on reviews from 29 critics, indicating "generally unfavorable reviews". Audiences surveyed by CinemaScore gave the film a grade "A−" on scale of A to F.

Roger Ebert of the Chicago Sun-Times asked "Do you get the feeling these movies are assembled from off-the-shelf parts?" and although he doesn't ask for originality, he criticizes the complete lack of surprises. Ebert praises the technical merits of the film "But you can pump up the volume only so far before it becomes noise." Ebert called Perabo the "reason to see the movie" saying "She has one of those friendly Julia Roberts smiles, good comic timing, ease and confidence on the screen, and a career ahead of her in movies better than this one. Lots better." Peter Travers of Rolling Stone dismissed the film "Bruckheimer claims he's made a film about female empowerment, but it's soft-core pap for horny boys and their hornier dads."
Robert Koehler of Variety called it "The latest and most calculated re-do on the formulaic fantasy of an innocent conquering Gotham."

VH1 made a statement about Rimes' appearance in the film stating, "Rimes [herself], who is only 17 years old, was sporting leather pants and a skimpy top and in all likelihood, even with a fake ID, would never have been allowed inside any NYC bar."

Years after its original release, the film has found success as a cult film and example of early-2000s fashion and culture. Justin Kirkland of Esquire praised the film for "capturing the hilariously sincere optimism of the Year 2000", saying "Coyote Ugly is a categorically bad film, but in its 101 minute run, it manages to capture the vibe of an iconic year that was plucky and unassuming with a delusional and misplaced sense of hope."

Home media 
In summer 2005, an unrated special edition (the original release was rated PG-13 and the director's cut rated R) was released on DVD. It was also released in the UK and rated 15 by the BBFC. (By contrast, the theatrical cut was rated 12 in the UK.)

The extended cut adds approximately six minutes to the film's runtime, most of which consists of additional shots of the "coyotes" dancing on the bar and of Violet and Cammie trying on different outfits while shopping. Arguably, the most notable additions are the extension of the sex scene between Violet and Kevin (Perabo used a body double for most of the scene), and the inclusion of an additional scene which shows the "Coyotes" winning a softball game because Cammie distracts the pitcher by stripping.

The special features of the extended cut DVD are identical with those of the previous DVD release.

Soundtracks 
The film's soundtrack features Violet's four songs from the film, performed by LeAnn Rimes and written by Diane Warren, as well as several other songs not exclusive to the film. It achieved gold status within one month of its release on August 1, 2000 and platinum status on November 7, 2000. On April 18, 2001, the soundtrack was certified 2× Platinum and on January 9, 2002, it was certified 3× Platinum. The soundtrack was certified 4× Platinum on July 22, 2008, was certified 5× Platinum (500,000 units) in Canada and gold (100,000 units) in Japan in 2002.

Three singles were released from the soundtrack, all three by LeAnn Rimes, "Can't Fight the Moonlight" which achieved gold status, became a nearly instant hit on the radio charts and peaked at No. 11 on The Billboard Hot 100, "But I Do Love You" and "The Right Kind of Wrong".

A second soundtrack, More Music from Coyote Ugly, with more songs that appeared in the film and remixes of two of Rimes' songs, followed on January 28, 2003.

Although Perabo was able to sing for her character, it was decided that Rimes, owing to her soprano-type voice, would provide Violet's singing voice far better for the role. This means that during Rimes' cameo, she is effectively duetting with herself.

Coyote Ugly soundtrack

Charts

Weekly charts

Year-end charts

Certifications and sales

More Music from Coyote Ugly

Other songs in the film 
The following songs appear in the film, but are on neither of the two released soundtracks.

 "Party Up (Up in Here)" by DMX
 "Fly" by Sugar Ray
 "I Will Survive" by Gloria Gaynor
 "That's Me" by Tara MacLean
 "Wherever You Will Go" by The Calling
 "Pour Some Sugar on Me" by Def Leppard
 "Fly Away" by Lenny Kravitz
 "Beer:30" by Reverend Horton Heat
 "Follow Me" by Uncle Kracker
 "Cruisin' for a Bruisin'" by Nurse With Wound
 "Never Let You Go" by Third Eye Blind
 "Love Is Alive" by Anastacia
 "Cowboy" by Kid Rock
 "Tony Adams" by Joe Strummer & The Mescaleros
 "Cailin" by Unwritten Law
 "Can't Help Falling in Love" by Elvis Presley
 "Like Water" by Chalk Farm
 "I Love Rock N Roll" by Joan Jett & the Blackhearts
 "Wherever You Will Go" by The Calling (Fiji Mermaid Club scene)

References

External links 

 
 
 
  Comparison of the theatrical release and the Unrated Edition, with screenshots

2000 films
2000 directorial debut films
2000 romantic comedy-drama films
2000s musical comedy-drama films
2000s romantic musical films
American musical comedy-drama films
American romantic comedy-drama films
American romantic musical films
Country music films
2000s English-language films
Films about bartenders
Films about writers
Films produced by Jerry Bruckheimer
Films set in music venues
Films set in New Jersey
Films set in New York City
Films shot in California
Films shot in Los Angeles
Films shot in New Jersey
Films shot in New York City
Touchstone Pictures films
2000s American films
2000s female buddy films